Karen Israelyan (born on 26 March 1992 in Yerevan, Armenia) is an Armenian professional football goalkeeper. He is currently an unattached player. He last played for the Armenian Premier League club Ararat Yerevan. He was also a member of the Armenia U-21 and Armenia national teams.

References

Living people
Footballers from Yerevan
Armenian footballers
Association football goalkeepers
Armenia international footballers
FC Pyunik players
1992 births
Armenian Premier League players